FC Gustavia was a Barthélemois football club located in Gustavia, Saint Barthélemy. The club has won the Saint-Barthelemy Championships once in 2004.
A recent club called AS Gustavia has no link with this club.

Honours 
 Saint-Barthelemy Championships:
 Winners (1): 2003–04

References 

Gustavia
Gustavia, Saint Barthélemy